Igor Vladimirovich Mordvinov (born 21 June 1972) is a former Russian professional footballer.

Club career
He made his professional debut in the Russian Third Division in 1994 for FC Torpedo Pavlovo. He played 2 games and scored 1 goal in the UEFA Intertoto Cup 1997 for FC Lokomotiv Nizhny Novgorod.

References

1972 births
People from Pavlovo, Nizhny Novgorod Oblast
Living people
Russian footballers
Association football midfielders
Russian Premier League players
FC Lokomotiv Nizhny Novgorod players
FC Akhmat Grozny players
FC Sodovik Sterlitamak players
FC Kristall Smolensk players
FC Khimik Dzerzhinsk players
FC Spartak Kostroma players
FC Chita players
Sportspeople from Nizhny Novgorod Oblast